St Paul's Cathedral is an Anglican cathedral in Lisbon, seat of the Lusitanian Catholic Apostolic Evangelical Church, which is a member church of the Anglican Communion. It is situated on Rua das Janelas Verdes, in the freguesia of Prazeres.

History 
The cathedral is located in what was the complex of a Discalced Carmelites convent known as Convent of Our Lady of the Remédios or Convent of the Marianos. Construction of the convent began in 1606 and completed in 1611. Built in Mannerist architectural style, with its simplicity according to the rules of the Order of the Discalced Carmelites.

In 1872, the building was put up for sale at a public auction, the property was bought by the Presbyterian Free Church of Scotland, which generated a lot of controversy due to the religious issue. In 1898, the complex was acquired by the Portuguese Anglican Lusitanian Church, and part of it was converted into the Church's headquarters.

See also 
 St. George's Church, Lisbon
 Protestantism in Portugal

References 

Lisbon
Anglican cathedrals in Europe
Churches in Lisbon
Lisbon
Churches completed in 1611
Mannerist architecture in Portugal